In mathematics, a discrete valuation is an integer valuation on a field K; that is, a function:

satisfying the conditions:

for all .

Note that often the trivial valuation which takes on only the values  is explicitly excluded.

A field with a non-trivial discrete valuation is called a discrete valuation field.

Discrete valuation rings and valuations on fields
To every field  with discrete valuation  we can associate the subring

Conversely, the valuation  on a discrete valuation ring  can be extended in a unique way to a discrete valuation on the quotient field ; the associated discrete valuation ring  is just .

Examples
 For a fixed prime  and for any element  different from zero write  with  such that  does not divide .
 Given a Riemann surface , we can consider the field  of meromorphic functions . In a similar manner, one also defines a discrete valuation on the function field of an algebraic curve for every regular point  on the curve.

More examples can be found in the article on discrete valuation rings.

Citations

References

Commutative algebra
Field (mathematics)